was a town located in Minamiazumi District, Nagano Prefecture, Japan.

As of 2003, the town has an estimated population of 27,546 and a density of 704.32 persons per km². The total area is 39.11 km².

On October 1, 2005, Toyoshina, along with the town of Akashina (from Higashichikuma District), the town of Hotaka, and the villages of Horigane and Misato (all from Minamiazumi District), was merged to create the city of Azumino.

The name Toyoshina is an acronym of the four antecedent villages: Toba, Yoshino, Shinden, and Nariai.

Dissolved municipalities of Nagano Prefecture
Azumino, Nagano